Our Sir Vancelot (foaled 11 November 1990) is a New Zealand standardbred stallion. Known as Sir Vancelot in New Zealand, he won a record three straight Inter Dominion finals, 1997, 1998 and 1999. This is a record that was equalled in 2008 by Blacks A Fake. He was inducted into the Inter Dominion Hall of Fame.

In addition to the three Inter Dominions, he also won the 1997 Miracle Mile Pace.

Over his career, he won 48 races, from 97 starts for a total prize money earnings of $2,197,990.

He is currently stands at Warwick Stud, in Victoria for A$2,200.

References

1990 racehorse births
Inter Dominion winners
New Zealand standardbred racehorses
Miracle Mile winners